The year 1952 in film involved some significant events.

Top-grossing films

United States

The top ten 1952 released films by box office gross in the United States are as follows:

International

Events
January 10 – Cecil B. DeMille's circus epic, The Greatest Show on Earth, is premièred at Radio City Music Hall in New York City.
March 27 – The MGM musical Singin' in the Rain premieres at Radio City Music Hall in New York City.
May 26 – Decision reached in Joseph Burstyn, Inc. v. Wilson determining that certain provisions of the New York Education Law allowing a censor to forbid the commercial showing of any non-licensed motion picture film, or revoke or deny the license of a film deemed to be "sacrilegious," was a "restraint on freedom of speech" and thereby a violation of the First Amendment to the United States Constitution.
September 19 – While Charlie Chaplin is at sea on his way to the United Kingdom, the United States Attorney-General, James P. McGranery, announces plans to review his right to return to the US.
September 30 – The Cinerama multiple-projection widescreen system, invented by Fred Waller, makes its début in New York with the film This Is Cinerama.
November 27 – Bwana Devil, the first American, feature-length, color 3-D film, is released, and begins the demand for 3-D films that lasts for the next two years.

Awards

Notable films released in 1952
United States unless stated

#
1st of April, 2000 – (Austria)
5 Fingers, directed by Joseph L. Mankiewicz, starring James Mason

A
Abbott and Costello Meet Captain Kidd, starring Bud Abbott and Lou Costello
Above and Beyond, starring Robert Taylor and Eleanor Parker
Affair in Trinidad, starring Rita Hayworth and Glenn Ford
Against All Flags, starring Errol Flynn and Maureen O'Hara
Alraune, starring Hildegard Knef and Erich von Stroheim – (West Germany)
Andrine og Kjell – (Norway)
Androcles and the Lion, starring Jean Simmons and Victor Mature
Angel Face, starring Robert Mitchum and Jean Simmons
Angels One Five, starring Jack Hawkins – (GB)
Anhonee, starring Raj Kapoor and Nargis – (India)
At Sword's Point, starring Maureen O'Hara and Cornel Wilde
The Atomic City, starring Gene Barry and Lydia Clarke

B
Babes in Bagdad, starring Paulette Goddard and Gypsy Rose Lee
The Bad and the Beautiful, starring Lana Turner, Kirk Douglas, Walter Pidgeon, Dick Powell, Barry Sullivan,  Gloria Grahame
Baiju Bawra, starring Meena Kumari – (India)
The Beast Must Die (La Bestia debe morir) – (Argentina)
Because of You, starring Loretta Young
Because You're Mine, starring Mario Lanza
The Belle of New York, starring Fred Astaire and Vera-Ellen
Les Belles de nuit (Beauties of the Night), directed by René Clair – (France)
Belles on Their Toes, starring Myrna Loy, Jeanne Crain, Debra Paget
Bend of the River, directed by Anthony Mann, starring James Stewart, Arthur Kennedy, Julie Adams, Rock Hudson
Beware, My Lovely, starring Ida Lupino and Robert Ryan
Big Jim McLain, starring John Wayne and James Arness
The Big Sky, starring Kirk Douglas
The Big Trees, starring Kirk Douglas
The Black Castle, starring Stephen McNally, Boris Karloff, Lon Chaney, Jr.
Blackbeard the Pirate, starring Robert Newton
Brandy for the Parson, starring James Donald and Kenneth More – (GB)
Buffalo Bill in Tomahawk Territory, starring Clayton Moore
The Bushwackers, starring John Ireland and Lawrence Tierney

C
California Conquest, starring Cornel Wilde and Teresa Wright
Captive Women, starring Robert Clarke
Carbine Williams, starring James Stewart and Jean Hagen
The Card, starring Alec Guinness, Glynis Johns, Petula Clark – (GB)
Carrie, starring Laurence Olivier, Jennifer Jones, Miriam Hopkins
Carson City, starring Randolph Scott
Casque d'Or (Golden Helmet), directed by Jacques Becker, starring Simone Signoret – (France)
Children of Hiroshima (Gembaku no ko) – (Japan)
Ciguli Miguli – (Yugoslavia)
The City Stands Trial (Processo alla città), directed by Luigi Zampa – (Italy)
Clash by Night, directed by Fritz Lang, starring Barbara Stanwyck, Robert Ryan, Paul Douglas, Marilyn Monroe
Come Back, Little Sheba, starring Burt Lancaster and Shirley Booth
The Crimson Pirate, starring Burt Lancaster

D
Dark River (Las aguas bajan turbias) – (Argentina)
Deadline - U.S.A., directed by Richard Brooks, starring Humphrey Bogart, Ethel Barrymore, Kim Hunter, Jim Backus, Martin Gabel
Denver and Rio Grande, starring Edmond O'Brien and Sterling Hayden	 
Derby Day, starring Anna Neagle and Michael Wilding – (Britain)
Desperate Search, starring Howard Keel and Jane Greer
The Devil Makes Three, starring Gene Kelly
Diplomatic Courier, directed by Henry Hathaway, starring Tyrone Power
Don't Bother to Knock, starring Richard Widmark, Anne Bancroft, Marilyn Monroe
Down Among the Z Men, starring The Goons – (GB)
Dreamboat, starring Ginger Rogers, Clifton Webb, Elsa Lanchester, Anne Francis

E
Emergency Call, directed by Lewis Gilbert, starring Jack Warner, Anthony Steel, Joy Shelton and Freddie Mills – (U.K.)
Europa '51, directed by Roberto Rossellini, starring Ingrid Bergman – (Italy)
The Eyes Leave Tracks (Los ojos dejan huella), starring Raf Vallone – (Spain)

F
Face to Face, starring James Mason and Robert Preston
Fanfan la Tulipe (a.k.a. Fearless Little Soldier), starring Gérard Philipe and Gina Lollobrigida – (France)
Flaming Feather, starring Sterling Hayden
Flavor of Green Tea Over Rice ( Ochazuke no aji), directed by Yasujirō Ozu – (Japan)
Flesh and Fury, starring Tony Curtis and Jan Sterling
Forbidden Games (Jeux interdits), directed by René Clément – winner of Oscar for best foreign language film – (France)

G
A Girl in Every Port, starring Groucho Marx, William Bendix, Marie Wilson, Dee Hartford
The Golden Coach (Le Carrosse d'or), directed by Jean Renoir, starring Anna Magnani – (France/Italy)
The Greatest Show on Earth, directed by Cecil B. DeMille, starring Betty Hutton, Cornel Wilde, Charlton Heston, Gloria Grahame, Dorothy Lamour, James Stewart

H
Hangman's Knot, starring Randolph Scott, Donna Reed, Lee Marvin
Hans Christian Andersen, starring Danny Kaye and Farley Granger
 The Happy Family, directed by Muriel Box, starring Stanley Holloway and Kathleen Harrison – (GB)
The Happy Time, starring Charles Boyer and Bobby Driscoll
Has Anybody Seen My Gal?, starring Piper Laurie, Rock Hudson, Charles Coburn
Heidi, directed by Luigi Comencini – (Switzerland)
Hellgate, starring Sterling Hayden
Hiawatha, starring Vince Edwards
High Noon, directed by Fred Zinnemann, starring Gary Cooper (Oscar for best actor) and Grace Kelly
Los hijos de María Morales (The Children of Maria Morales), starring Pedro Infante – (Mexico)
Holiday for Sinners, starring Gig Young and Janice Rule
The Holly and the Ivy, starring Ralph Richardson and Celia Johnson – (GB)
Home at Seven, directed by and starring Ralph Richardson – (GB)
Horizons West, starring Robert Ryan, Rock Hudson, Raymond Burr
Hunted, directed by Charles Crichton, starring Dirk Bogarde and Jon Whiteley – (GB)

I
The I Don't Care Girl, starring Mitzi Gaynor and Oscar Levant
I Dream of Jeanie, starring Bill Shirley
Ikiru (To Live), directed by Akira Kurosawa, starring Takashi Shimura – winner of Golden Bear – (Japan)
The Importance of Being Earnest, directed by Anthony Asquith, starring Michael Redgrave – (GB)
Indian Uprising, starring George Montgomery
It Grows on Trees, starring Irene Dunne
Ivanhoe, starring Robert Taylor, Joan Fontaine, Elizabeth Taylor

J
Jaal (Net), starring Dev Anand – (India)
Jack and the Beanstalk, starring Bud Abbott and Lou Costello
Japanese War Bride, starring Shirley Yamaguchi and Don Taylor
The Jazz Singer, starring Danny Thomas and Peggy Lee
Jolanda la figlia del corsaro nero (Jolanda, the Daughter of the Black Corsair) – (Italy)
Jumping Jacks, starring Dean Martin and Jerry Lewis
Just This Once, starring Janet Leigh, Peter Lawford

K
Kangaroo, starring Maureen O'Hara, Peter Lawford
Kansas City Confidential, starring John Payne and Coleen Gray
Kid Monk Baroni, starring Leonard Nimoy

L
Lady in the Iron Mask, starring Louis Hayward
Lambert the Sheepish Lion
The Last Page, a.k.a. Man Bait, starring George Brent, Marguerite Chapman, Diana Dors – (GB)
The Life of Oharu (Saikaku ichidai onna), directed by Kenji Mizoguchi – (Japan)
Lightning (Inazuma), directed by Mikio Naruse – (Japan)
Limelight, directed by and starring Charlie Chaplin, with Claire Bloom
Lone Star, starring Clark Gable and Ava Gardner
Lost in Alaska, starring Bud Abbott and Lou Costello
Lovely to Look At, starring Kathryn Grayson, Howard Keel, Red Skelton 
Lure of the Wilderness, starring Jean Peters, Jeffrey Hunter, Walter Brennan
The Lusty Men, starring Robert Mitchum

M
Macao, starring Robert Mitchum and Jane Russell
Mandy, starring Phyllis Calvert and Jack Hawkins – (GB)
The Marrying Kind, starring Judy Holliday
Meet Danny Wilson, starring Frank Sinatra
The Member of the Wedding, starring Julie Harris
The Merry Widow, starring Lana Turner
Mexican Bus Ride (Subida al cielo), directed by Luis Buñuel – (Mexico)
Million Dollar Mermaid, starring Esther Williams and Victor Mature
The Miracle of Our Lady of Fatima, starring Gilbert Roland
Les Misérables, starring Michael Rennie, Robert Newton, Debra Paget
Monkey Business, starring Cary Grant, Ginger Rogers, Charles Coburn, Marilyn Monroe
Monsoon, starring Diana Douglas and Ursula Thiess
Montana Belle, starring Jane Russell
Moulin Rouge, starring José Ferrer and Zsa Zsa Gabor – (GB)
My Cousin Rachel, starring Olivia de Havilland and Richard Burton
My Pal Gus, starring Richard Widmark and George Winslow
My Six Convicts, starring Gilbert Roland
My Son John, starring Robert Walker and Van Heflin

N
The Narrow Margin, directed by Richard Fleischer, starring Charles McGraw
Neighbours – (Canada)
Never Look Back directed by Francis Searle, starring Rosamund John – (GB)
No Room for the Groom, directed by Douglas Sirk, starring Tony Curtis and Piper Laurie

O
O. Henry's Full House, an anthology film starring Charles Laughton, David Wayne, Marilyn Monroe, Richard Widmark, Anne Baxter, Jeanne Crain
One Big Affair, starring Evelyn Keyes
One Minute to Zero, directed by Tay Garnett, starring Robert Mitchum and Ann Blyth
Othello (a.k.a. The Tragedy of Othello: The Moor of Venice), written, directed by and starring Orson Welles
Outcast of the Islands, directed by Carol Reed, starring Ralph Richardson and Trevor Howard – (GB)
The Overcoat (Il Cappotto) – (Italy)

P
Pahit-Pahit Manis, starring Titien Sumarni and Chatir Harro (Indonesia)
Panta Rhei, directed by Bert Haanstra
Pat and Mike, starring Spencer Tracy and Katharine Hepburn
Phone Call from a Stranger, starring Shelley Winters and Gary Merrill
The Pickwick Papers, starring James Hayter and James Donald – (GB)
Le Plaisir (a.k.a. House of Pleasure), directed by Max Ophüls, starring Claude Dauphin – (France)
The Planter's Wife, directed by Ken Annakin, starring Claudette Colbert, Jack Hawkins & Anthony Steel – (GB)
Pony Soldier, starring Tyrone Power
The Pride of St. Louis, starring Dan Dailey
The Prisoner of Zenda, starring Stewart Granger, Deborah Kerr, James Mason, Jane Greer

Q
The Quiet Man, directed by John Ford, starring John Wayne and Maureen O'Hara

R
Rancho Notorious, starring Marlene Dietrich
Red Ball Express, starring Jeff Chandler
Red Planet Mars, starring Peter Graves
Retreat, Hell!, starring Frank Lovejoy
Return of the Texan, starring Dale Robertson and Joanne Dru
Reverón, directed by Margot Benacerraf
Road to Bali, starring Bing Crosby and Bob Hope
Rome 11:00 – (Italy)
Room for One More, starring Cary Grant and Betsy Drake
Ruby Gentry, starring Jennifer Jones, Charlton Heston and Karl Malden

S
Sailor Beware, starring Dean Martin and Jerry Lewis
Sangdil, starring Dilip Kumar and Madhubala – (India)
Saturday Island, starring Linda Darnell and Tab Hunter – (GB)
The Savage, starring Charlton Heston and Susan Morrow
Scandal Sheet, starring Broderick Crawford and Donna Reed
Scaramouche, starring Stewart Granger and Janet Leigh
The Scarlet Flower (Alenkiy tsvetochek) – (U.S.S.R.)
Sea Tiger, starring Marguerite Chapman
Secrets of Women (Kvinnors väntan), directed by Ingmar Bergman, starring Eva Dahlbeck – (Sweden)
Siempre tuya (Forever Yours) –  (Mexico)
Singin' in the Rain, starring Gene Kelly, Debbie Reynolds, Jean Hagen, Donald O'Connor
The Sniper, directed by Edward Dmytryk
The Snow Maiden (Snegurochka) – (U.S.S.R.)
The Snows of Kilimanjaro, starring Gregory Peck and Ava Gardner
Something Money Can't Buy, directed by Pat Jackson, starring Patricia Roc, Anthony Steel, Moira Lister & A.E. Matthews – (U.K.)
Something to Live For, directed by George Stevens, starring Joan Fontaine and Teresa Wright
Son of Paleface, directed by Frank Tashlin, starring Bob Hope, Jane Russell, Roy Rogers
Song of the Sea (O canto do mar), directed by Alberto Cavalcanti – (Brazil)
The Sound Barrier, directed by David Lean, starring Ralph Richardson – (GB)
Springfield Rifle, starring Gary Cooper and Phyllis Thaxter
The Star, starring Bette Davis and Sterling Hayden
Stars and Stripes Forever, starring Clifton Webb, Debra Paget, Robert Wagner and Ruth Hussey
Steel Town, starring Ann Sheridan and John Lund
The Steel Trap, starring Joseph Cotten and Teresa Wright
The Stooge, starring Dean Martin and Jerry Lewis
Stop, You're Killing Me, starring Broderick Crawford and Claire Trevor
The Story of Will Rogers, starring Will Rogers, Jr. and Jane Wyman
Sudden Fear, starring Joan Crawford, Jack Palance, Gloria Grahame

T
The Hour of 13, starring Peter Lawford
The Thief, starring Ray Milland
This Is Cinerama, directed by Merian C. Cooper
Thunderbirds, starring John Derek
Tico-Tico no Fubá, directed by Adolfo Celi – (Brazil)
Toto in Colour (Totò a colori), starring Totò – (Italy)
Toxi, directed by Robert A. Stemmle (West Germany)
Trent's Last Case, starring Orson Welles and Michael Wilding – (GB)
The Turning Point, starring William Holden, Alexis Smith, Edmond O'Brien
Two Cents Worth of Hope (Due soldi di speranza) – (Italy)

U
Umberto D., directed by Vittorio De Sica – (Italy)
Untamed Frontier, starring Joseph Cotten and Shelley Winters

V
La villa Santo-Sospir, short film directed by Jean Cocteau – (France)
Viva Zapata!, starring Marlon Brando and Jean Peters

W
We're Not Married!, starring Ginger Rogers, Marilyn Monroe, Eve Arden, Paul Douglas, Eddie Bracken, Mitzi Gaynor
The White Reindeer (Valkoinen peura) – (Finland)
The White Sheik (Lo sceicco bianco), directed by Federico Fellini – (Italy)
Who Goes There!, starring Nigel Patrick and Valerie Hobson – (GB)
Wide Boy, starring Sydney Tafler and Susan Shaw – (GB)
The Wild North, starring Stewart Granger and Cyd Charisse
Wings of Danger, directed by Terence Fisher, starring Zachary Scott – (GB)
The Witch (Noita palaa elämään) – (Finland)
With a Song in My Heart, starring Susan Hayward
A Woman Without Love (Una mujer sin amor), directed by Luis Buñuel – (Mexico)
The World in His Arms, starring Gregory Peck, Anthony Quinn, Ann Blyth

Y
You for Me, starring Peter Lawford, Jane Greer, Gig Young
Young Man with Ideas, starring Glenn Ford and Ruth Roman

Film releases

January–March
February 7 - Viva Zapata!
February 13 - Snow White and the Seven Dwarfs (re-release)
February 22
5 Fingers
One Big Affair

April–June
May 2 - The Narrow Margin
May 15 - Outcast of the Islands
June 13 - No Room for the Groom
June 26 - The Story of Robin Hood and His Merrie Men

July–September
July 21 - One Minute to Zero
July 23 - Untamed Frontier
September 18 - O. Henry's Full House

October–December

Serials
Blackhawk, starring Kirk Alyn
King of the Congo, starring Buster Crabbe
Radar Men from the Moon, starring George D. Wallace and Aline Towne
Son of Geronimo starring Clayton Moore
Zombies of the Stratosphere, starring Judd Holdren and Leonard Nimoy

Short film series
Mickey Mouse (1928–1953)
Looney Tunes (1930–1969)
Terrytoons (1930–1964)
Merrie Melodies (1931–1969)
Popeye (1933–1957)
The Three Stooges (1934–1959)
Donald Duck (1936)-(1956)
Goofy (1939–1953)
Tom and Jerry (1940–1958)
Bugs Bunny (1940–1962)
Mighty Mouse (1942–1955)
Chip and Dale (1943–1956)
Droopy (1943–1958)
Yosemite Sam (1945–1963)

Births
January 1 - David Andrews (actor), American character actor
January 6
Armelia McQueen, American actress (died 2020)
Frank Sivero, Italian-American character actor
January 11 - Bille Brown, Australian actor (died 2013)
January 18 - Michael Angelis, English actor (died 2020)
January 22 – Ace Vergel, Filipino actor (died 2007)
February 2 - Carol Ann Susi, American actress (died 2014)
February 4
Lisa Eichhorn, American actress
Richard Lineback, American actor
February 12 – Simon MacCorkindale, English actor (died 2010)
February 14 - Anton Lesser, English actor
March 2 – Laraine Newman, American actress, voice actress, comedian and writer
March 6 - John David Carson, American actor (died 2009)
March 11 - James Fleet, English actor
March 19 – Harvey Weinstein, American producer
March 24 - Nicholas Campbell, Canadian actor and filmmaker
March 27 – Kalju Orro, Estonian actor
April 1 – Annette O'Toole, American actress
April 6 – Marilu Henner, American actress
April 7
Dennis Hayden (actor), American actor, producer and writer
Clarke Peters, American-British actor, writer and director
April 10 – Steven Seagal, American actor & martial artist
April 11 - Michael Thomas (actor), British actor (died 2019)
April 15 – Glenn Shadix, American actor (died 2010)
April 16 – Billy West, American voice actor, musician, singer and songwriter
April 17 - Joe Alaskey, American stand-up comedian, actor, voice artist, and impressionist (died 2016)
April 28 – Mary McDonnell, American actress
May 1 - Pierre van Pletzen, South African actor, writer and director
May 2 – Christine Baranski, American actress
May 6 – Gregg Henry, American actor & musician
May 9 - Patrick Ryecart, English actor
May 11
Shohreh Aghdashloo, Iranian-American actress
Frances Fisher, British-born American actress
May 14 – Robert Zemeckis, American director
May 15 – Chazz Palminteri, American actor
May 20 - Julia Deakin, English actress
May 21 - Mr. T, American actor, bodyguard, television personality and retired professional wrestler
June 5 - Connie Chiume, South African actress and filmmaker
June 7 – Liam Neeson, Northern Irish actor
June 18
Miriam Flynn, American voice actress and character actress
Carol Kane, American actress
Isabella Rossellini, Italian actress
June 20 – John Goodman, American actor
June 22 - Graham Greene (actor), Canadian actor
June 30 - Patrick Pinney, American actor
July 1
Dan Aykroyd, Canadian actor & comedian
Brian George, Israeli-English actor, voice artist, comedian and singer
July 3 - Rick Ducommun, Canadian stand-up comedian, actor, writer and producer (died 2015)
July 8 - Mary Ellen Trainor, American character actress (died 2015)
July 11
Tim de Zarn, American actor
Stephen Lang, American actor
July 15
Celia Imrie, English actress
Terry O'Quinn, American actor
July 17 - David Hasselhoff, American actor, singer, producer and television personality
July 20
Adrian Biddle, English cinematographer (died 2005)
Nathaniel Lees, New Zealand actor and director
July 21 - George Wallace (American comedian), American comedian and actor
July 24 – Gus Van Sant, American director
August 10 
Daniel Hugh Kelly, American actor
Diane Venora, American actress
August 16 – Reginald VelJohnson, American actor
August 18 – Patrick Swayze, American actor & dancer (died 2009)
August 19 – Jonathan Frakes, American actor & director 
August 26 – Michael Jeter, American actor (died 2003)
August 27 – Paul Reubens, American actor, comedian, writer and producer
September 4
Alan Blumenfeld, American character actor
Rishi Kapoor, Indian actor (died 2020)
September 6 - Vitali Baganov, Russian actor
September 8 - David R. Ellis, American director and stunt performer (died 2013)
September 9 - Angela Cartwright, British-American actress
September 13 - Christine Estabrook, American actress
September 16 – Mickey Rourke, American actor and screenwriter
September 19 – Rein Aedma, Estonian actor
September 24 – Christopher Reeve, American actor (died 2004)
September 25 - Colin Friels, Scottish-born Australian actor
September 30 - Al Leong, American stuntman and actor
October 5 - Harold Faltermeyer, German musician and composer
October 7
Mary Badham, American actress
Tom McBride (actor), American model and actor (died 1995)
October 13 - John Lone, Chinese-American actor
October 14 - Rick Aviles, American stand-up comedian and actor (died 1995)
October 22 – Jeff Goldblum, American actor
October 27 – Roberto Benigni, Italian actor
October 28
Annie Potts, American actress
Jim Turner (comedian), American actor and stand-up comedian
November 3 
Roseanne Barr, American actress and stand-up comedian
Jim Cummings, American voice actor
November 8 – Alfre Woodard, American actress
November 9 - John Megna, American actor and director (died 1995)
November 13 - Art Malik, Pakistani-born British actor
November 14
Bill Farmer, American voice actor and comedian
Chris Noonan, Australian filmmaker and actor
Maggie Roswell, American actress, comedian, writer and producer
November 15 – Randy Savage, American professional wrestler, commentator, actor, rapper and professional baseball player (died 2011)
November 18 – Delroy Lindo, British actor
November 24 – Ulrich Seidl, Austrian director
November 28 - S. Epatha Merkerson, American actress
November 30 – Mandy Patinkin, American actor
December 3 - Mel Smith, English comedian, actor and director (died 2013)
December 8 - Greg Collins (American football), American character actor and former professional football linebacker
December 12 – Sarah Douglas, English actress
December 20 – Jenny Agutter, English actress
December 29 – Külliki Saldre, Estonian actress

Deaths
 
January 18 – Curly Howard, comedian (born 1903), The Three Stooges
January 25 – Polly Moran, actress (born 1883), Chasing Rainbows, Adam's Rib
March 1 – Gregory La Cava, director (born 1892), My Man Godfrey, Stage Door
March 26 – J. P. McGowan, director (born 1880), Where the West Begins, Tarzan and the Golden Lion
April 21 – Leslie Banks, actor (born 1890), The Most Dangerous Game, Jamaica Inn
May 21 – John Garfield, actor (born 1913), Body and Soul, Nobody Lives Forever, Gentleman's Agreement
May 8 – William Fox, movie executive (born 1879), 7th Heaven
May 26 – Richard Rober, actor (born 1910), The Well, The File on Thelma Jordon
June 27 – Elmo Lincoln, actor (born 1889), Tarzan of the Apes, The Adventures of Tarzan
July 6 – Gertrud Wolle, actress (born 1891), The Hound of the Baskervilles
August 2 – J. Farrell MacDonald, actor (born 1875), Me and My Gal, The Last Alarm
August 18 – Ralph Byrd, actor (born 1909), Dick Tracy's Dilemma, The Vigilante
August 28 – Lamar Trotti, screenwriter (born 1900), The Ox-Bow Incident, Cheaper by the Dozen
September 7 – Gertrude Lawrence, actress (born 1898), Rembrandt, The Glass Menagerie
October 11 – Jack Conway, director (born 1888), Boom Town, Libeled Lady, Viva Villa!
October 17 – Julia Dean, stage and screen actress (born 1878), A Society Exile, The Curse of the Cat People
October 20 – Basil Radford, actor (born 1887), actor, Crook's Tour, The Galloping Major
October 23 – Susan Peters, actress (born 1921), Song of Russia, Random Harvest
October 26 – Hattie McDaniel, actress (born 1895), Gone with the Wind, Saratoga
November 1 – Dixie Lee, actress (born 1912), Manhattan Love Song, Love in Bloom
November 6 – George H. Reed, actor, (born 1866), Huckleberry Finn, Green Pastures

Film Debuts 
Anne Bancroft – Don't Bother to Knock
Brigitte Bardot – Crazy for Love
Geraldine Chaplin – Limelight
George Hamilton – Lone Star
Earl Holliman – Pony Soldier
Jonathan Harris – Botany Bay
Julie Harris – The Member of the Wedding
Carolyn Jones – The Turning Point
Henry Silva – Viva Zapata!
Lee Van Cleef – High Noon

Notes

References

 
Film by year